Alberto Barazzetta (born 18 February 2001) is an Italian professional footballer who plays as a right back.

Club career
Born in Monza, Barazzetta started his career on AC Milan youth. On 9 September 2020, he signed for Serie C club Giana Erminio until June 2022.

International career
Youth international for Italy since U-15, Barazzetta played on the 2018 UEFA European Under-17 Championship.

References

External links

FICG U15
FICG U16
FICG U17
FICG U18

2001 births
Living people
Sportspeople from Monza
Footballers from Lombardy
Italian footballers
Association football defenders
Serie C players
A.C. Milan players
A.S. Giana Erminio players
Italy youth international footballers